XWindows Dock was a clone of the dock in Mac OS X Leopard for Windows. It is freely available under Creative Commons license.

Features
 2D & 3D Full Skin Customization Design.
 Stacks like in Leopard.
 Minimize Windows. Supports two effects: Default and Genie.
 Live reflections of icons and windows.
 Customizable sounds.
 Bounce effect for icons and stacks.
 Skin Maker Included.
 XML for Language file creation.
 Gallery view for pictures and documents
 Docklets for special purposes such as a calendar and weather docklet.
 Configurable number of zoomed icons.
 Folder monitoring.
 Option to show icon shadow, and to define opacity and blur of the shadow.
 Auto-update.

See also
 Dock (computing)

References
 CNET Editors' review
  Anke Anlauf (14 January 2010), Schmucke PC-Docks wie auf dem Mac , Softonic OnSoftware
  Андрей Крупин (26 June 2009) Панели для Windows в стиле Mac OS X, Computerra

External links
 Official website

Application launchers
Utilities for Windows
Freeware